Mersada Bećirspahić (born 8 December 1957) is a former basketball player who competed for Yugoslavia in the 1980 Summer Olympics.

References

1957 births
Living people
Bosniaks of Bosnia and Herzegovina
People from Bihać
Yugoslav women's basketball players
Bosnia and Herzegovina women's basketball players
Olympic basketball players of Yugoslavia
Basketball players at the 1980 Summer Olympics
Olympic bronze medalists for Yugoslavia
Olympic medalists in basketball
Centers (basketball)
ŽKK Željezničar Sarajevo players
Medalists at the 1980 Summer Olympics